Suzanne Davis (married name: King; February 7, 1912 – July 28, 1991) was an American figure skater who competed in ladies singles. She was the 1934 U.S. national champion.

She was born in Waban, Massachusetts and died in Richmond, Virginia.

Davis competed in the 1932 Winter Olympics and finished twelfth in the ladies singles competition.

Results

References

 
  
 
 

1912 births
1991 deaths
American female single skaters
Olympic figure skaters of the United States
Figure skaters at the 1932 Winter Olympics
Sportspeople from Newton, Massachusetts
20th-century American women